Enterprise is a town in Clarke County, Mississippi, United States. The population was 526 at the 2010 census.

History
Enterprise was so named "to denote the policy of their inhabitants".

Geography
Enterprise is located in northwestern Clarke County at  (32.173620, -88.821935). The Chickasawhay River is formed at Enterprise by the confluence of the Chunky River and Okatibbee Creek.

U.S. Route 11 passes through the west side of the town, leading north  to Meridian and south  to Laurel.

Demographics

2020 census

As of the 2020 United States census, there were 496 people, 202 households, and 137 families residing in the town.

2000 census
As of the census of 2000, there were 474 people, 202 households, and 138 families residing in the town. The population density was 209.0 people per square mile (80.6/km2). There were 241 housing units at an average density of 106.3 per square mile (41.0/km2). The racial makeup of the town was 75.74% White, 23.84% African American, 0.21% Asian, and 0.21% from two or more races. Hispanic or Latino of any race were 0.21% of the population.

There were 202 households, out of which 29.7% had children under the age of 18 living with them, 53.0% were married couples living together, 12.9% had a female householder with no husband present, and 31.2% were non-families. 28.2% of all households were made up of individuals, and 13.9% had someone living alone who was 65 years of age or older. The average household size was 2.35 and the average family size was 2.83.

In the town, the population was spread out, with 23.6% under the age of 18, 7.4% from 18 to 24, 26.8% from 25 to 44, 24.7% from 45 to 64, and 17.5% who were 65 years of age or older. The median age was 39 years. For every 100 females, there were 97.5 males. For every 100 females age 18 and over, there were 92.6 males.

The median income for a household in the town was $33,125, and the median income for a family was $37,375. Males had a median income of $29,583 versus $21,719 for females. The per capita income for the town was $16,995. About 9.2% of families and 13.5% of the population were below the poverty line, including 14.5% of those under age 18 and 23.5% of those age 65 or over.

Education
The town of Enterprise is served by the Enterprise School District. Enterprise High School is one of two high schools in Clarke County.

Notable person
 Chester Harding, governor of the Panama Canal Zone from 1917 to 1921

See also

 List of municipalities in Mississippi

References

External links

 

Towns in Clarke County, Mississippi
Towns in Mississippi
Meridian micropolitan area